James Chance, also known as James White (born James Siegfried, April 20, 1953), is an American saxophonist, keyboard player, and singer.

A key figure in no wave, Chance has been playing a combination of improvisational jazz-like music and punk in the New York music scene since the late 1970s, in such bands as Teenage Jesus and the Jerks, James Chance and the Contortions, James White and the Blacks (as he appeared in the film Downtown 81), The Flaming Demonics, James Chance & the Sardonic Symphonics, James Chance and Terminal City, and James Chance and Les Contortions.

Biography 
Born and raised in Milwaukee and Brookfield, Wisconsin, Chance attended Michigan State University, then the Wisconsin Conservatory of Music in Milwaukee. There, Chance joined a band named Death, which performed covers of the Stooges and the Velvet Underground before moving toward original songs. At the end of 1975, Chance dropped out and moved to New York City after the dissolution of the band and the death of its singer. He quickly became active in both the free jazz and no wave punk rock scenes. His first band in New York in 1976 was an instrumental quartet with violin, drums and bass called Flaming Youth. He started Teenage Jesus and the Jerks with Lydia Lunch the same year. In 1977, after studying for a short time under David Murray, Chance formed The Contortions, who fused jazz improvisation and funky rhythms, with live shows often ending in violence when Chance would confront audience members. The Contortions reached a wider audience with their contribution to the Brian Eno-compiled No New York collection of No Wave acts. The band appeared in Rosa von Praunheim's film Das Todesmagazin in 1979.

While Chance was professionally and romantically linked with No Wave musical luminary Lydia Lunch, the duo created seminal No Wave group Teenage Jesus and the Jerks, whom Chance soon left.

Chance was noted for engaging in physical confrontations, from forcing the audience out of their seats and getting in fist fights with his New York City audience, including rock critic Robert Christgau. At first, this was just an attempt to engage the passive New York audience, but this practice is reported to have somewhat diminished after audiences came to expect the physical confrontations. He has said racial slurs and expressed racist sentiments in a number of interviews.

In 1979, Chance collaborated with Arto Lindsay, Bradley Field, and George Scott on the soundtrack to Diego Cortez's film Grutzi Elvis.

Chance's stage and musical persona were finalized by romantic partner and agent Anya Phillips, who died of cancer in 1981. Frictions between Chance and band members eventually led to a breakup of the Contortions in the fall of 1979. The Contortions released one album, Buy in late 1979, and another album, Off White, under the pseudonym James White and the Blacks in 1980 (featuring Lydia Lunch under the pseudonym Stella Rico). Chance re-formed James White and the Blacks with a completely different lineup that appeared on the 1982 album Sax Maniac which was dedicated to Phillips. The group released one more album, Melt Yourself Down, a very limited Japanese release.

The first version of the Blacks was set up by Joseph Bowie. Shortly after, Defunkt emerged from the Blacks. In 1982 Chance toured with the re-formed James White and the Blacks with his brother David "Tremor" Siegfried and his band David and the Happenings from Carbondale, Illinois, playing Chicago, their hometown Milwaukee, and much of the Midwest.

Chance briefly relocated to Paris, returning to New York City in 1983 to record the album James White Presents The Flaming Demonics.

In 1987, he contributed saxophone to The False Prophets' Implosion album.

In 2001, Chance reunited with original Contortions members Jody Harris (guitar), Pat Place (slide guitar) and Don Christensen (drums) for a few limited engagements. Original keyboard player Adele Bertei appeared briefly, but bass player George Scott III had died of an accidental drug overdose in 1980 and his slot was filled by Eric Sanko. The reunited group has played twice at the All Tomorrow's Parties music festival, and, in 2008, at the PS1 Warm Up series. Chance has also recorded with Blondie since coming out of his semi-retirement. Tiger Style records released the 4-CD box set retrospective Irresistible Impulse to critical acclaim in 2003. A live-DVD James Chance – Chance of a Lifetime: Live in Chicago 2003 was released in 2005.

In addition to limited engagements with the original Contortions, Chance has occasionally performed and recorded with the Chicago band Watchers. In Europe, he performs with James Chance & Les Contortions, French musicians who have been his backing band since 2006. They played a 15 show Europe tour in April and May 2007 and were back in Europe in October 2007. In May 2012 they released the CD Incorrigible! on the French label LADTK, comprising seven Chance originals and two covers, all of them brand new recordings.

In 2009 Chance made occasional appearances playing keyboards in NYC with a trio, with the material restricted to close readings of jazz standards. In June 2012, Chance played in Portland, OR with local group Ancient Heat as his backing band. They played a number of songs from various points in his career, including a new cover of Gil Scott-Heron's "Home is Where The Hatred Is."

In 2016, 19-year-old Dylan Greenberg directed James Chance in the music video for a re-recorded version of Melt Yourself Down, his first music video in nearly 20 years. The video premiered on MOJO.

Discography

Albums 
James Chance and the Contortions
 Buy (ZE Records, 1979) (as Contortions)
 Live aux Bains Douches (Invisible, France 1980)
 Live in New York (ROIR cassette, 1981)
 Soul Exorcism (ROIR cassette, 1991)
 Lost Chance (ROIR 1995, recorded 1981)
 Molotov Cocktail Lounge (Enemy Records, 1996)
 Incorrigible! (LADTK, France 2012) (as James Chance et les Contortions)
 The Flesh is Weak (True Groove, 2016)
James White and the Blacks
 Off White (ZE Records, 1979)
 Sax Maniac (Animal, 1982)
 Melt Yourself Down (Selfish Records, Japan 1986)
James Chance and Pill Factory
 Theme from Grutzi Elvis (EP) (ZE 1979)
James White's Flaming Demonics
 James White's Flaming Demonics (ZE 1983)
James Chance and Terminal City
 The Fix is In (decade 01 / Interbang Records IBR005 2010)
Solo
 James Chance – Chance of A Lifetime: Live in Chicago 2003 (RUNT 2005)

Appears On 
 No New York (compilation, 1978) (with The Contortions)
 Teenage Jesus and the Jerks: Pre Teenage Jesus and the Jerks (EP ZE 1978) (prehistory of the band)
 Downtown 81 (soundtrack, 1981)
 Debbie Harry: Rockbird (album, 1986)
 Medium Cool (compilation, 1991), Chet Baker tribute with Alex Chilton, Adele Bertei, and Angel Torsen
 Somewhere in the City (1998)
 Blondie: No Exit (album, 1999) guest artist on alto saxophone
 Red Hot Chili Peppers Jukebox Track "Contort Yourself" (compilation, Mojo Magazine, 2004)
 TV Party (2005)
 Watchers: Rabble (guest artist) (album, 2006)
 Watchers: Vampire Driver  (guest artist) (album, 2006)
 Acoustic Ladyland – Skinny Grin (album, 2006)
 Kirin J. Callinan – Bravado (album, 2017)

See also 
Mudd Club
Tier 3
Just Another Asshole
No wave music
No Wave Cinema

References

Sources 
 Masters, Marc. No Wave. London: Black Dog Publishing, 2007. 
 Moore, Alan W., and Marc Miller (eds.). ABC No Rio Dinero: The Story of a Lower East Side Art Gallery. New York: Collaborative Projects, 1985
 Pearlman, Alison, Unpackaging Art of the 1980s. Chicago: University Of Chicago Press, 2003.
 Reynolds, Simon. "Contort Yourself: No Wave New York." In Rip It Up and Start Again: Post-punk 1978–84. London: Faber and Faber, Ltd., 2005.
 Reynolds, Simon. Totally Wired: Post-Punk Interviews and Overviews. London: Faber and Faber, 2009. 
 Taylor, Marvin J. (ed.). The Downtown Book: The New York Art Scene, 1974–1984, foreword by Lynn Gumpert. Princeton: Princeton University Press, 2006.

External links 

 Official website
 
 Biography of James Chance on ZE Records

1953 births
Living people
American jazz keyboardists
American jazz saxophonists
American male saxophonists
American punk rock saxophonists
Michigan State University alumni
Wisconsin Conservatory of Music alumni
No wave musicians
Musicians from Milwaukee
American post-punk musicians
ROIR artists
ZE Records artists
21st-century American saxophonists
21st-century American male musicians
American male jazz musicians
Teenage Jesus and the Jerks members
James Chance and the Contortions members